The Bill Masterton Memorial Trophy is awarded annually to the National Hockey League player who best exemplifies the qualities of perseverance, sportsmanship, and dedication to ice hockey. It is named after Bill Masterton, the only player in NHL history to die as a direct result of injuries suffered during a game. The winner is selected by a poll of the Professional Hockey Writers' Association after each team nominates one player in competition. It is often awarded to a player who has come back from career– or even life-threatening illness or injury.

History
The trophy is named in honor of the late Bill Masterton, a Minnesota North Stars player who died on January 15, 1968, after sustaining an injury during a hockey game. During his playing career, Masterton exhibited "to a high degree the qualities of perseverance, sportsmanship, and dedication to hockey". A US college standout at Denver University, Masterton had briefly played in the Montreal Canadiens organization before giving up his professional dreams and taking a job as an engineer at Honeywell in Minneapolis. During his spare time, he played senior amateur hockey including for the US national team, where he was scouted by the expansion North Stars and became the club's first contracted player. It was first awarded following the 1967–68 regular season. As of the end of the 2018–19 NHL season, players for the New York Rangers and Montreal Canadiens have won the trophy five times; players for the Boston Bruins and Philadelphia Flyers have won the trophy four times; and players for the Los Angeles Kings and the New York Islanders have won the trophy three times.  Players on Western Conference teams have won the award only 18 times since the award was first given in the 1960s.

Winners

See also
List of National Hockey League awards
List of NHL players
List of NHL statistical leaders

References

Notes

External links
Bill Masterton Memorial Trophy at NHL.com

National Hockey League trophies and awards
Sportsmanship trophies and awards